Paapi is a 1977 Bollywood film directed by O. P. Ralhan. The film stars Sunil Dutt, Sanjeev Kumar, Zeenat Aman, Reena Roy in lead roles. The music was composed by Bappi Lahiri.

Cast
Sunil Dutt as Inspector Raj Kumar
Sanjeev Kumar as Dr. Ashok Roy
Zeenat Aman as Rano / Rani / Vanita Kapoor
Reena Roy as Asha 
Prem Chopra as Vikram 
Padma Khanna as Kitty 
Madan Puri as Harnamdas
Iftekhar as Police Inspector  
Durga Khote as Ashok's Mother 
Jagdish Raj as Inspector Bhaskar 
O. P. Ralhan as Rocky
Alka as Dolly D'Costa
Tun Tun as Laila 
Danny Denzongpa as Abdul
Hina Kauser as Sita

Soundtrack

External links
 

1977 films
Films scored by Bappi Lahiri
1970s Hindi-language films